International Wrestling Cartel is an American professional wrestling promotion based in Pittsburgh, Pennsylvania. It is currently owned and operated by Justin Plummer.

Norm Connors ran the promotion for 19 years until he handed the reigns to then announcer Chuck Roberts.  Chuck Roberts owned the International Wrestling Cartel till 2015 before being sold to Justin Plummer.  IWC holds live events and pay-per-views now exclusively on their streaming network, the IWC Network.  Annual PPV events include Winner Takes All, Caged Fury, Reloaded, Night of the Superstars, and the long lasting Super Indy Tournament. IWC aired 56 episodes of a weekly television show called IWC Ignition.   

In 2019, the promotion unveiled the IWC Network which allowed streaming of live events and a back-catalog of past events as far back as 2002. Produced by 2:1 Media, events began streaming live for IWC Network subscribers or available as one-time purchases.  The IWC is best known for their annual Super Indy Tournament. This tournament has featured many participants and winners who have gone on to become major television stars, and is often considered to be a launching pad into professional wrestling success.  The local wrestlers would refer to popular, well known wrestlers as "Super Indy" and the tournament was born.   

Such talent from AEW and WWE have worked for the IWC (CM Punk, Sterling James Keenan (Corey Graves),  Colt Cabana, Christopher Daniels, AJ Styles.).  IWC's Iron City Wrestling Academy is responsible for the training of current stars such as Britt Baker, Wardlow, and Logan Shulo (Elias).

Championships

Current championships

Super Indy Tournament

References

American independent professional wrestling promotions based in Pennsylvania
Professional wrestling in Pittsburgh
Companies based in Pittsburgh